Poppy Hills Golf Course is the newest golf course in Pebble Beach, California, after undergoing an extensive 13-month renovation that was completed in April 2014. The original Poppy Hills was designed by Robert Trent Jones, Jr., and opened in 1986. Along with Pebble Beach Golf Links and Spyglass Hill Golf Course, Poppy Hills co-hosted the PGA Tour's AT&T Pebble Beach National Pro-Am from 1991 to 2009, replacing Cypress Point in the rotation. Poppy Hills co-hosted the Champions Tour's Nature Valley First Tee Open with Pebble Beach for three years, beginning in September of 2014.

Poppy Hills was the first course in the United States to be owned and operated by an amateur golf association, the Northern California Golf Association. Poppy Hills is the headquarters and tournament home of the NCGA, which also owns Poppy Ridge Golf Course in Livermore. Poppy Hills was featured in the original Tiger Woods PGA Tour video game series in 1999, and was an active course through 2004.

Course
Poppy Hills is the only course of the seven in Pebble Beach that plays exclusively in the forest. It is also unique because it features bentgrass greens and no rough, both of which are rare on the Monterey Peninsula. The renovation by RTJ II Golf Course Architects reduced the par from 72 to 71, but the yardage increased from 6,863 to 7,002. The entire course was topped with a 5-inch layer of sand, a process called sand capping, which dramatically improves the drainage, fostering firm and fast conditions year-round. All 18 greens were redesigned, reducing the strong undulations that previously existed. While the greens are roughly the same size as before, they are now easier to hit with a low-running shot because of the firmer conditions and elimination of rough. The renovation also softened the sharp doglegs and heavy mounding that previously existed. Naturalized waste areas and pine straw were added throughout the course, bringing the forest more into play while also reducing irrigated turf from 82 acres to 62, which has greatly improved water conservation efforts.

The 12th hole was converted from a sharp dogleg-right par 5 to a straightaway par 4 that features an elevated tee and a view of the Monterey Bay and Santa Cruz Mountains, changing the par on the back nine from 36 to 35, and the overall par from 72 to 71. The 11th hole is the only brand new hole on the course, as it went from the longest par 3 on the property to the shortest, and plays in the opposite direction. Every hole was changed, but all the others stayed within their same routing.

Poppy Hills also completely renovated its practice facility and clubhouse. The restaurant, Porter's at Poppy Hills, was also reinvented, and is now run by executive chef Johnny De Vivo, formerly of Casanova and La Bicyclette in Carmel. The practice facility is headed by Jeff Ritter, a Golf Digest Best Young Teacher.

AT&T Pebble Beach National Pro-Am
Poppy Hills replaced Cypress Point Club as one of the host courses of the AT&T Pebble Beach National Pro-Am in 1991.  The switch occurred after the private club did not immediately admit an African-American member, despite the request of the Tour. Poppy Hills last hosted the AT&T National Pro-Am in 2009. The AT&T moved to Monterey Peninsula Country Club's Shore Course in 2010. Matt Gogel set the Poppy Hills course record with a 10-under 62 during the 2001 AT&T.

Reception 
The new Poppy Hills has been widely heralded since it reopened in 2014. Golf.com Travel Writer Joe Passov said the new Poppy Hills has a "Pinehurst-like touch, with just a hint of near-neighbor Cypress Point." Golf Getaways Travel Writer Vic Williams added about the new design, "at certain times it feels like Pinehurst, other times like Augusta, with dashes of Pine Valley."

References

External links
Poppy Hills Golf Course
Article about the criticism of Poppy Hills from the San Francisco Chronicle
Reviews of the new Poppy Hills
A course tour of the new Poppy Hills

Golf clubs and courses in California
Sports venues in Monterey County, California
Pebble Beach, California